Kalateh-ye Reza Khan (also Romanized as Kalāteh-ye Reẕā Khān and Kalāteh-ye Rezā Khān; also known as Kalāteh and Kalāteh-ye Yūsef) is a village in Dughayi Rural District, in the Central District of Quchan County, Razavi Khorasan Province, Iran. At the 2006 census, its population was 144, in 37 families.

References 

Populated places in Quchan County